Wolterstorffina chirioi is a species of toad in the family Bufonidae. It is endemic to Cameroon and known only from Mount Oku, its type locality. The specific name chirioi honours Laurent Chirio, a herpetologist from the National Museum of Natural History, France; he also collected the holotype.

Description
One juvenile measured . The head is flat above. The snout is short. No tympana nor parotoid glands are present. The dorsum is smooth medially but warty on the flanks. The limbs are long and relatively slender. The outer edges of the feet are thickened.

Habitat and conservation
It is believed that it does not depend on aquatic habitats for its breeding.

This species has a very restricted distribution and has been recorded only twice after its description. Its habitat is threatened by overgrazing and fire. Given its limited high-altitude range, it is potentially affected by climate change too.

References

amphibians described in 2001
amphibians of Cameroon
endemic fauna of Cameroon
frogs of Africa
taxa named by Jean-Louis Amiet
Wolterstorffina